The Maine State Prison was erected in Thomaston, Maine in 1824 and relocated to Warren in 2002. This maximum-security prison has a capacity of 916 adult male inmates with an average daily population of 900.

History

The state legislature established the Maine State Prison in Thomaston in 1824. The original layout of the prison kept prisoners housed in covered subterranean granite cells, nine feet 8 inches deep. The top opening of each cell measured four feet six inches by eight feet nine inches. Inmates entered their cells through a two foot square opening in the cell's cover, secured with an iron grate. In the prison's early years, the majority of prisoners died of tuberculosis before completing their sentences.

In 1923 the prison was destroyed by a fire in which many inmates died. The old prison was replaced by a facility with two cellblocks. The cells were modeled on the Auburn System. There were long narrow hallways with very small cells— each. The 1923 prison was very modern for the time and most things were performed by technology, like the locking and unlocking of doors.

The Maine State Prison had a farm several miles away where select prisoners worked. Most produce was used by the prison and not for sale. Other prisoners worked in carriage shops, harness shops, and in maintenance. In the summer of 1927 there were 197 white prisoners, three African American prisoners, and one prisoner of another race. The Maine state prison housed few females, who worked sewing and patching clothing. The women were relocated to the Women's Correctional Center in Skowhegan, Maine in 1935.

Move in 2002
The old Maine State Prison in Thomaston was moved to a new, larger prison in Warren in February 2002 because of the growing prisoner population. Some residents in Thomaston objected to the relocation of the prison out of their town, because it was a part of their history and local economy. The prison was razed in the summer of 2002 and the site of the prison in Thomaston was converted into a field.

Incidents
 In 1998, Michael Chasse was arrested for breaking into the home of Robert Cohen, the brother of former Maine Senator William Cohen. As Chasse was being escorted to his trial for the break-in, he threw a white powdery substance into the guards’ faces and ran off, but was caught five hours later.  
 On November 11, 2005, Portland Phoenix newspaper began an exposé series detailing the prison's alleged misuse of forcible extraction techniques and restraint chairs. Following a wave of public criticism, Corrections Commissioner Warren Magnusson promised to "de-escalate" use of the restraint chair, and asked the US Department of Justice's National Institute of Corrections to review the management of Maine Supermax.
 On June 30, 2008, Chasse, by then a prisoner of the Maine State Prison, took another prisoner and a staff member hostage. Chasse had what appeared to be a knife taped to his hand. After a seven-hour stand off, the two hostages were released with minor cuts. On November 3, 2011 Michael Chasse died while at the New Jersey State Prison, where he had been sent since Maine could no longer hold him in the prison due to his behavior.
 Gary Watland, a prisoner at the Maine State Prison serving a 25-year sentence for murder, devised a plan to have his wife, Susan Watland, bring a gun into the prison with the intent of taking hostages. Another prisoner alerted staff. On October 24, 2006 Susan Watland entered the prison with a loaded pistol but was apprehended by officials before any shots were fired. She was arrested and later sentenced to three years in prison with credit for time served, probation, and a fine. She has since been released. Gary Watland has since been transferred to the ADX Florence, a supermax penitentiary in Florence, Colorado.

Special Management Unit
The Special Management Unit (SMU) is a restrictive housing unit that has two pods. One pod houses the ACU or Administrative Control Unit which houses residents who are threats to themselves or others, are escape risks, or violate institutional rules, such as fighting or having weapons or other contraband, or have seriously assaulted other residents or staff. Most residents in the ACU are on 21-hour lockdown. They receive two hours a day exercise in a recreation yard and most services, such as meals and medication, are brought to them in their cells. They also receive programming to allow them to earn their way back into general population. The ACU has a level system that is based on behavior and programming and allows the resident to earn privileges.  The second pod houses the residents who are on DSeg time and are awaiting admission to the ACU or could not be housed in general population on DSeg time due to their violent behavior.

Prison management
The Maine State prison uses the team management system. A team of staff for each housing unit meets periodically to talk about the needs of each prisoner, determine their custody level, and set goals for each prisoner to reach. Education programs are available to inmates including GED prep, typing, English, horticulture, science, and college prep math.  College courses are also available for prisoners. Prisoners placed in the SMU have access to educational, mental health, and other programs in-cell.

See also 

 Maine Department of Corrections

References

  
 

Buildings and structures in Thomaston, Maine
Prisons in Maine
Warren, Maine
2002 establishments in Maine